Hila or Hilla (Hebrew: הילה) is a Hebrew feminine given name meaning "halo", a cognate of the Arabic Hala (given name). It was among the most popular given names for girls in Israel in 2012.

People

First name
Hilla Becher (1934–2015), German photographer 
Hila Bronstein (born 1983), German singer, known as a member of Bro'Sis
Hila Elmalich (1973–2007), Israeli fashion model
Hila Klein (born 1987), an Israeli-American YouTube comedian
Hilla Limann (1934–1998), Ghanaian politician and president
Hila Lulu Lin (born 1964), Israeli painter
Hilla Nachshon (born 1980), Israeli actress and television presenter
Hila Plitmann (born 1973), American singer
Hila Sedighi (born 1985), Iranian poet and painter 
Hilla Vidor (born 1975), Israeli actress
Hilla von Rebay (1890–1967), American artist

Surname
Ardit Hila (born 1993), Albanian football player
Elena Hila (born 1974), Romanian athlete

See also
Hila (disambiguation)
Hillah, Iraq

Notes

Hebrew feminine given names